Bournstream is a village located in Gloucestershire, England.

Villages in Gloucestershire
Stroud District